Jack McNab may refer to:

Jack McNab (rugby union, born 1895) (1895–1979), New Zealand rugby union player for Hawke's Bay and the national team
Jack McNab (rugby union, born 1924) (1924–2009), New Zealand rugby union player for Otago and the national team